Tsun Jin High School （） is a Chinese independent high school situated along Jalan Loke Yew in Kuala Lumpur, Malaysia, established in 1955.

History
Predecessors of The Selangor Fui Chiu Association founded the Tsun Jin Primary School in 1913. In the early 1950, to provide students with a holistic Chinese education and to pass on the Chinese culture, the Tsun Jin Board of Governors thus established an independent Chinese high school. The high school section was officially in operation in 1955. In 1962, many local Chinese schools opted for systemic reformation. Convinced of the unique and significant mission of the independent Chinese high school, the Tsun Jin Board of Governors resolved to stay in the noble course. Various construction plans have been sequentially implemented. Besides that, the school has celebrated its 60th anniversary in 2015 and the school held a performance on 25 and 26 July 2015. The school hired Beh Kim Chuan as the Head Director of the performance.

Facilities
Today, the school's facilities include a library, 8 badminton courts, an air-conditioned hall with a capacity of 800 persons which provides a venue for concerts and lectures, and a main hall built in 2009 having a capacity of 2,500 persons. A music room is usually occupied by the choir society.

Clubs 
Among the many clubs and societies are the Police Cadet, Editorial Club, St.John Ambulance, Boy's Scout and Girl's Guide, Orchestra, Debate, and Elocution (debate and elocution are divided by three languages). The timetable for this school is fixed except for assembly days.

Awards

The school Chinese Debate team captain Justin has won the Asian Debate Cup several times while their English Debate team has won several awards over the years including the HELP University 2014 International Chinese Secondary School Debate Competition.

The Tsun Jin basketball team has won numerous awards over the years including the Ruby Cup, Selangor-Kuala Lumpur Chinese Independent High School Inter-school Tournament, and many others.

Notable alumni
Lee Ying Ha, politician
Tracy Lee, actress

References

External links
 Tsun Jin High School Website

Chinese-Malaysian culture in Kuala Lumpur
Secondary schools in Kuala Lumpur
Chinese-language schools in Malaysia
Educational institutions established in 1955
Schools in Kuala Lumpur
1955 establishments in Malaya